Cyclostrema spirula is a species of sea snail, a marine gastropod mollusk in the family Liotiidae.

Taxonomy
Examination (Warén & Bouchet 1988) of the holotype of Cyclostrema (Daronia) spirula revealed that it is a land snail belonging to the family Neocyclotidae (synonym: Poteriidae). Furthermore, it is so similar to Buckleyia martinezi (Hidalgo), the type species of this genus, that we do not hesitate to consider it an older synonym of Daronia (synonym: Buckleyia).

Description
The planorbular, white shell is cancellated with elevated, decussating transverse and longitudinal lines. It is very widely umbilicated. The spire is excavated. The whorls are rapidly increasing, spirally striated, with a sloping, smooth sutural margin. The body whorl becomes disjointed. The large aperture is round and cancellated with the lips. The cancelli are transversely striated. The outer margin of the periphery is crenate.

Distribution
This terrestrial species occurs on beaches of the Philippines.

References

spirula
Gastropods described in 1850